Felice Joseph Torza (March 15, 1920 – December 23, 1983) was an American professional golfer who played in the 1940s, 1950s and 1960s.

Biography
Torza was born in Naples, Italy, on March 15, 1920. Like most of the golfers of his generation, he earned his living primarily as a club professional during his regular career years.  Torza worked as the head club pro at the Aurora Country Club in Aurora, Illinois for 28 years.

Torza was the runner-up in the 1953 PGA Championship.  He was defeated 2&1 in the final by Walter Burkemo, in the match play era.

Torza was nicknamed Toy Tiger by his fellow golfers due to his fiercely competitive nature and  diminutive stature.

Torza was inducted into the Connecticut Golf Hall of Fame in 1965. He was awarded the Illinois PGA Professional of the Year award in 1968.

He died on December 23, 1983.

Professional wins
1946 Connecticut Open
1947 Rhode Island Open
1950 Illinois Open Championship
1958 Illinois Open Championship 
1965 Illinois Match Play Championship

References

American male golfers
PGA Tour golfers
Golfers from Connecticut
Italian emigrants to the United States
Sportspeople from Hartford, Connecticut
1920 births
1983 deaths